The 2015 Sha Tin District Council election was held on 22 November 2015 to elect all 38 elected members to the 39-member Sha Tin District Council.

The pan-democrats and the pro-Beijing camp both won 19 seats but the pro-Beijing camp was still able to control the council with 1 ex officio member.

Overall election results
Before election:

Change in composition:

References

External links
 Election Results - Overall Results

2015 Hong Kong local elections